Barbenuta (Spanish pronunciation: [bar'βenuta]) is a locality situated in the municipality of Biescas (Alto Gállego, Huesca, Aragon, Spain). In 2019, it had a population of 6 inhabitants.

Barbenuta was a standalone municipality in the 1842 census, until it was integrated into Yésero and later passed onto Berbusa. It was once again a standalone municipality in the 1920 census but was later integrated into Biescas.

References 

Populated places in the Province of Huesca